Athletes from the Netherlands competed at the 1994 Winter Olympics in Lillehammer, Norway.

Medalists

Competitors
The following is the list of number of competitors in the Games.

Bobsleigh

Men

Freestyle skiing

Short track speed skating

Men

Women

Speed skating

Men

Women

References

Official Olympic Reports
International Olympic Committee results database
Olympic Winter Games 1994, full results by sports-reference.com

Nations at the 1994 Winter Olympics
1994
1994 in Dutch sport